Acrogynomyces is a genus of fungi in the family Laboulbeniaceae. The genus contain six species.

See also
List of Laboulbeniaceae genera

References

Laboulbeniales genera
Laboulbeniomycetes